Jorge Washington Quiñónez Tenorio is an Ecuadorian boxer best known to win Heavyweight Bronze at the 2007 Pan American Games.

Career
At the PanAms he lost a razor-thin countback decision to Jose Julio Payares in the semifinal.

At the first Olympic qualifier the 22-year-old again lost a countback decision, this time to Deontay Wilder at the second qualifier he had moved up a class and lost to Jose Julio Payares.

External links
PanAm Games 2007

Year of birth missing (living people)
Living people
Heavyweight boxers
Ecuadorian male boxers
Pan American Games bronze medalists for Ecuador
Pan American Games medalists in boxing
South American Games silver medalists for Ecuador
South American Games medalists in boxing
Boxers at the 2007 Pan American Games
Competitors at the 2010 South American Games
Medalists at the 2007 Pan American Games
21st-century Ecuadorian people